The gasogene (or gazogene or seltzogene) is a late Victorian device for producing carbonated water. It consists of two linked glass globes: the lower contained water or other drink to be made sparkling, the upper a mixture of tartaric acid and sodium bicarbonate that reacts to produce carbon dioxide.  The produced gas pushes the liquid in the lower container up a tube and out of the device. The globes are surrounded by a wicker or wire protective mesh, as they have a tendency to explode.

The earliest occurrence of the word noted in the Oxford English Dictionary dates from 1853, quoting a reference in  Practical Mechanic's Journal on "Gaillard and Dubois' 'Gazogene' or Aerated Water apparatus".

In popular culture

A gasogene is mentioned as a residential fixture at 221B Baker Street in Arthur Conan Doyle's Sherlock Holmes story "A Scandal in Bohemia": "With hardly a word spoken, but with a kindly eye, he waved me to an armchair, threw across his case of cigars, and indicated a spirit case and a gasogene in the corner." One is also mentioned in "The Adventure of the Mazarin Stone". The device plays a key role in Bernard Shaw's 1905 comic play Passion, Poison, and Petrifaction, Or The Fatal Gazogene.

The word is also used in Douglas Preston and Lincoln Child's novel Brimstone, published in 2005, on page 106, and in their 2010 novel Fever Dream on page 362.

A gasogene is mentioned, on page 13, as being in the forensic laboratory of Dr. Kingsley, consultant forensic examiner of Scotland Yard in Alex Grecian's 2012 novel The Yard.

A gasogene is mentioned and its use described in Sherry Thomas's novel A Study in Scarlet Women (Book 1 of the Lady Sherlock series) on pages 244 to 246. (Ebook )

Amelia Peabody pulls a bottle of whiskey, a gasogene, and glasses from a hamper in order to make herself a whiskey and soda after getting her family on a train to Luxor in the novel The Golden One by Elizabeth Peters, a pen name of Barbara Mertz.

See also
 Soda syphon
 Sodastream

Notes

References

External links
 picture and description at 221b BAKER STREET/LA

Carbonated water
Industrial gases